Gattatico (Reggiano: ,  or ) is a comune (municipality) in the Province of Reggio Emilia in the Italian region Emilia-Romagna, located about  northwest of Bologna and about  northwest of Reggio Emilia. 

Gattatico borders the following municipalities: Brescello, Campegine, Castelnovo di Sotto, Parma, Poviglio, Sant'Ilario d'Enza, Sorbolo.

Twin towns
Gattatico is twinned with:

  Melissa, Calabria, Italy
  Zierenberg, Germany

References

Cities and towns in Emilia-Romagna